Sue Peterson is an American politician who sits in the South Dakota House of Representatives. A former banker and track coach, she is a member of the South Dakota Republican Party.

References

Living people
People from Sioux Falls, South Dakota
Year of birth missing (living people)
Republican Party members of the South Dakota House of Representatives
21st-century American politicians
21st-century American women politicians
Women state legislators in South Dakota